Serre-les-Moulières is a commune in the Jura department in the Bourgogne-Franche-Comté region in eastern France.

Population

See also
Communes of the Jura department

References

Communes of Jura (department)